Sodium triacetoxyborohydride, also known as sodium triacetoxyhydroborate, commonly abbreviated STAB, is a chemical compound with the formula Na(CH3COO)3BH. Like other borohydrides, it is used as a reducing agent in organic synthesis. This colourless salt is prepared by protonolysis of sodium borohydride with acetic acid:
NaBH4  +  3 HO2CCH3   →    NaBH(O2CCH3)3  +  3 H2

Comparison with related reagents
Sodium triacetoxyborohydride is a milder reducing agent than sodium borohydride or even sodium cyanoborohydride. It reduces aldehydes but not most ketones.  It is especially suitable for reductive aminations of aldehydes and ketones.

However, unlike sodium cyanoborohydride, the triacetoxyborohydride hydrolyzes readily, nor is it compatible with methanol. It reacts only slowly with ethanol and isopropanol and can be used with these.

NaBH(OAc)3 may also be used for reductive alkylation of secondary amines with aldehyde-bisulfite adducts.

Monoacetoxyborohydride
The combination of NaBH4 with carboxylic acids results in the formation of acyloxyborohydride species other than sodium triacetoxyborohydride. These modified species can perform a variety of reductions not normally associated with borohydride chemistry, such as alcohols to hydrocarbons and nitriles to primary amines.

See also
 Sodium cyanoborohydride - a slightly stronger reductant, but amenable to protic solvents
 Sodium borohydride - a stronger, cheaper reductant

References

Sodium compounds
Borohydrides
Reducing agents
Acetates